A Juchart (also Jucharte or Juchard, in French Pose, in Italian Pertica) was a unit of area measurement used in rural Switzerland until the early 20th century.  In other German speaking regions it was known as a Joch, Jochart, Jauchart, Jauch, Juck or Juckert. The Juchart was a measurement of the amount of farm land that a man could plow in one day. It is similar to the northern German traditional measurement of a Morgen, which was approximately the amount of land tillable by one man behind an ox in the morning hours of a day. In the French speaking Canton of Vaud a related unit of acreage, the Pose was used.

Size
As with most units of this type, the size of a Juchart varied widely. It depended on the productivity and shape of the land.

Notes

References

External links
 
 

History of Switzerland
Obsolete units of measurement
Units of area